Dolland may refer to:
Dolland Halt, railway halt on the Isle of Man
misspelling of Dollond, surname of opticians

See also
Dollands Moor Freight Yard, railway yard in Kent, England